Soñia R. Galaviz is an American politician serving as a member of the Idaho House of Representatives for the 16A district. She assumed office on December 1, 2022.

Early life and education 
The daughter of immigrants from Mexico, Galavis was born and raised in the Silver Valley region of Idaho. She earned a Bachelor of Arts, Master of Arts, and EdD in curriculum and instruction from Boise State University.

Career 
Outside of politics, Galavis is a teacher at Garfield Elementary School in Boise, Idaho. She was elected to the Idaho House of Representatives in November 2022 and assumed office on December 1, 2022.

References 

Living people
Idaho Republicans
Members of the Idaho House of Representatives
People from Boise, Idaho
Boise State University alumni
Women state legislators in Idaho
Educators from Idaho
American politicians of Mexican descent
Year of birth missing (living people)